Laura Tramuns Tripiana (born 19 February 1970 in Badalona) is an S8 swimmer from Spain.  She has a physical disability.  She competed at the 1996 Summer Paralympics and 2000 Summer Paralympics in swimming. In 1996, she earned a silver medal in the 100 meter breaststroke race.

References

External links 

 
 

1970 births
Living people
People from Badalona
Sportspeople from the Province of Barcelona
Spanish female breaststroke swimmers
Paralympic swimmers of Spain
Paralympic silver medalists for Spain
Paralympic medalists in swimming
Swimmers at the 1996 Summer Paralympics
Swimmers at the 2000 Summer Paralympics
Medalists at the 1996 Summer Paralympics
S8-classified Paralympic swimmers